Jaochimoceras is a genus of orthoceroid cephalopods from the Silurian of Central Europe (Bohemia) named by Baskov, 1960, and included in the Geisonoceratidae. As with the orthocerids, its shell is longiconic, siphuncle more or less central, and chambers somewhat long.

Note that Flower, 1976, regarded the Orthoceratidae and Geisonoceratidae as forming a continuous series, indivisible into separate families.

References

 Flower, R. H. 1976. Ordovician Cephalopod Faunas and Their Role in Correlation, in Bassett, M.C. (Ed); The Ordovician System: Proceedings of a Paleontological Association               Symposium; Birmingham, Eng. 1974. Univ of Wales and Welsh Nat’l Mus Press.
 Sweet, W. C. 1964 Nautiloidea- Orthocerida. Treatise on Invertebrate Paleontology, Part K. Geol Soc of America and Univ of Kansas Press. Teichert & Moore, (eds)
 Paleobiology DB -Joachimoceras

Prehistoric nautiloid genera
Prehistoric animals of Europe
Silurian cephalopods
Orthocerida